The 2012 Liga Indonesia First Division season (Indonesian: Divisi Satu Liga Indonesia 2012) is the seventeenth edition of Liga Indonesia First Division.

The competition starts on 31 March 2012 in Tulungagung and scheduled to finish by July 2012.

First stage
Total 56 clubs will participate in this season, divided into 12 groups. Some result in this stage is unknown.

Group winner and runner-up qualify for 2nd round.

Second stage
Total 24 clubs will participate in this stage, divided into 6 groups. All result in this stage is unknown.

Third stage
Total 12 clubs will participate in this stage, divided into 2 groups. Group winner and runner-up advances to Semifinal. Ranking 1 to 5/6 in each group promotion to 2013 Premier Division.

All match played in Krakatau Steel Stadium in Cilegon

Group XX

Group XIX

Knockout stage
The knockout stage of 2012 Liga Indonesia First Division (BLAI) is scheduled to begin on 10 July 2012 and to be completed on 14 July 2012 with the final at the Lebak Bulus Stadium in Jakarta.

Bracket

Semi-finals

Final

References

Liga Indonesia First Division seasons
3